The 2011 All Stars Match was the second of the annual representative exhibition match played between the Indigenous All Stars and the NRL All Stars which was held on the 12 of February 2011 at the Gold Coast's Skilled Park. The game was won by the NRL All Stars 28–12, claiming their first annual title. Canberra Raiders fullback Josh Dugan won the Preston Campbell medal for Man of the Match.
Preceding game included a  Women's All Stars exhibition match which was won by the NRL Women's All Stars 22-6.

Teams

1 - Greg Inglis was originally selected but withdrew due to injury. He was replaced by Beau Champion.
2 - Sam Thaiday was originally selected but withdrew due to injury. He was replaced by Cory Paterson whilst Joel Moon joined the interchange.
3 - Gareth Ellis was originally selected but withdrew due to injury. He was replaced by Liam Fulton.
4 - Preston Campbell was originally selected but withdrew due to injury. He was replaced by Matt Bowen whilst Anthony Mitchell joined the interchange. Johnathan Thurston was handed the captaincy title from Campbell.

Result

Women's All Stars match

The 2011 Women's All Stars Match was the first time the event was held. The game, played in twenty minute halves, was won by the All Stars team, by 20 points to six.

Women's Teams
Squads for the two teams were selected and announced in December for the match in February.

Women’s Indigenous All Stars: Bianca Ambrum, Theresa Anderson, Naomi Babongi, Natasha Baggow, Pat Fraser, Natalie Gala, Kaitlin Moss, Yvonne O'Neill, Angela Solomon, Rebecca Solomon, Tracy Thompson (Qld), Bo De La Cruz (NT), Chloe Caldwell, Candice Clay, Eunice Grimes, Mahalia Murphy, Kylie Pennell, Lavina Philip, Rachel Moreton, Ros Simpson, Tyan Smith, Julie Young, Rebecca Young.

Women’s All Stars: Heather Ballinger, Jo Barrett, Ali Brigginshaw, Natalie Dwyer, Erin Elliott, Steph Hancock, Suzanne Johnson, Renae Kunst, Karyn Murphy, Tahnee Norris, Tegan Rolfe, Tarah Westera (Qld), Teina Clark, Lisa Fiola, Kylie Hilder, Sonia Mose, Jess Palmer, Alexander Sulshi (NSW).

References

All Stars match
Rugby league on the Gold Coast, Queensland
NRL All Stars match